Strophanthus gratus is a plant in the dogbane family Apocynaceae.

Description
Its fragrant flowers feature a white corolla, topped by red or purple colour, with pink corona lobes.

Distribution and habitat
Strophanthus gratus is native to tropical Africa: from Senegal in the west, east and south to the Democratic Republic of the Congo. It is naturalized in Taiwan and also Trinidad and Tobago.

Uses
Strophanthus gratus has been used in local traditional medicine: ouabain derived from the plant's seeds is used as a treatment for heart failure. It has also been used as arrow poison.

References

gratus
Medicinal plants of Africa
Flora of West Tropical Africa
Flora of West-Central Tropical Africa
Plants described in 1849
Taxa named by Henri Ernest Baillon
Taxa named by William Jackson Hooker
Taxa named by Nathaniel Wallich